Jesus Miguel "Mike" Sanchez (born 17 February 1964) is a British rhythm and blues singer, pianist and songwriter. He is known for his work with the Big Town Playboys and Bill Wyman's Rhythm Kings, and for his solo career.

Sanchez, of Spanish-English heritage, was born in Hackney in the East End of London.

Discography

Playboy Boogie, Big Town Playboys (1985 – Making Waves)
Now Appearing, Big Town Playboys (1990 – Blue Horizon)
Crazy Legs, Big Town Playboys with Jeff Beck (1993 – Epic)
Hip Joint, Big Town Playboys (1994 – Blue Horizon)
Ready to Rock, The Big Six (1995 – Vinyl Japan)
Struttin' Our Stuff, Bill Wyman's Rhythm Kings (1997 – BMG/RCA)
Just a Game (1997 – MS-001)
Off the Clock...Live!, Big Town Playboys (1997 – Eagle)
Six Pack, Big Town Playboys (1998 -BTP)
Anyway the Wind Blows, Bill Wyman's Rhythm Kings (1998 – BMG/RCA)
On the Road Again, Bill Wyman's Rhythm Kings (2002 – Ripple Records)
Just Can't Afford It, Mike Sanchez (2000 – Doopin)
Blue Boy, Mike Sanchez (2001 – Doopin)
Women and Cadillacs, Mike Sanchez with Knock Out Greg & Blue Weather (2003 – Doopin)
You Better Dig It, Mike Sanchez (2008 – Doopin)
Babes and Buicks, Mike Sanchez with The Beat From Palookaville (2010 – Doopin)
Almost Grown, Mike Sanchez featuring Imelda May (2012 – Doopin)

References

External links
Official website

English male singers
English people of Spanish descent
People from Kidderminster
Living people
1964 births
British rhythm and blues musicians
People from Hackney Central
Bill Wyman's Rhythm Kings members